The 2007 Canadian Figure Skating Championships took place from January 15 to 21 at the Halifax Metro Centre in Halifax, Nova Scotia. The event is an annual figure skating competition held by Skate Canada, the nation's figure skating governing body. Skaters competed at the senior and junior levels in the disciplines of men's singles, women's singles, pair skating, and ice dancing. The top finishers are named to Canadian teams, which competes at the 2007 World Championships, the 2007 Four Continents Championships, and the 2007 World Junior Championships.

In addition to the normal competition programs, singles skaters at the senior level who placed lower than 12th in the 2006 Championships will compete in a qualifying round. A total of 24 skaters will compete in the short program, and the top 18 will move on to compete in the free skating.

Senior results

Men

Women

Pairs

Ice dancing

Junior results

Men

Women

Pairs

Ice dancing

International team selections

World Championships

Four Continents Championships

World Junior Championships

External links
 2007 Canadian Figure Skating Championships 
 Event and TV Schedules 
 List of Senior-Level Competitors 
 List of Junior-Level Competitors 

Canadian Figure Skating Championships
Canadian Figure Skating Championships
Sports competitions in Halifax, Nova Scotia
2007 in Canadian sports
2007 in Nova Scotia